Colin Lewis McAllister and Justin Patrick Ryan are Scottish interior decorators and television presenters, often billed as Colin and Justin.

As well as being co-hosts, McAllister and Ryan have also been a couple since 1986 and have been credited for introducing laminate flooring to British households. On 15 February 2008, they had a private civil partnership ceremony in London followed by a Caribbean honeymoon.

Although their main residence is in Glasgow, they divide their time between the United Kingdom and Canada, where they have also hosted programming for HGTV Canada and Cottage Life.

Television and radio programmes

2003–2005
The Million Pound Property Experiment
Million Pound Property Experiment was a BBC Television series which originally aired on BBC Two in the United Kingdom in 2003. In this, McAllister and Ryan renovated and re-sold properties for a profit as they gambled with a £100,000 loan from the BBC, with the ultimate goal being a sale of a property for £1M. Taking more than two years they bought, renovated and sold seven properties across the UK with the help of project manager Nigel Leck. Their final property sold for £1.25 million and after paying back all loans they made a profit of nearly £300,000 which was donated to BBC's Children in Need Appeal.

Twenty Ways to Make Money on Your Property
McAllister and Ryan counted down the best ways to increase the values of viewers' homes. The format also included Twenty Builders' Botch Ups and Twenty Design Crimes. The series was made for the UK's Five channel.

Trading Up
Trading Up (and overseas spin-off show Trading Up in the Sun) aired on BBC One in which McAllister and Ryan counselled people on how to successfully sell and buy property. The former concentrated on British homes while the latter saw the presenters travel around Spain and France in search of homes for British buyers.  Seven series were filmed with 210 episodes in total.

Housecall
This live format multi camera studio show, a production for BBC1, was hosted by Lowri Turner and co-presented by various experts such as chef James Martin and Colin and Justin. Spanning some seven series the decorators created live 'one hour' transformations interacting throughout with viewers. The emphasis was about creating 'style on a shoestring' and the show had a spin-off series called Housecall in the Country on which Colin and Justin also worked.

How Not to Decorate
How Not to Decorate aired on the UK's Channel 5 and followed the format of the popular What Not to Wear series, but in this case McAllister and Ryan were recruited to transform homes with dramatically ugly interior decoration schemes into something more stylish. Four seasons of 13 were filmed as well as a mini series featuring celebrity homes.

Three Celebs and a Baby
A British TV first, Colin and Justin, along with model Caprice, attempted to raise a £150,000 animatronic 'baby'. The show charted the three celebrities as they experienced the highs and lows of parenthood. Caprice infamously dropped her 'baby' while Colin and Justin later said in interviews that it made them realise they would indeed make good parents.

2006–2009
The Farm
In 2006, McAllister and Ryan hosted the reality series The Farm on Five.

Wedding Belles
In McAllister and Ryan's next programme, Wedding Belles, which aired on Five in 2007, they became wedding decorators to prospective brides. Four one hour episodes now showing across the globe.

Hogmanay Stories
McAllister and Ryan presented STV's 2008/2009 Hogmanay Stories, a mix of traditional Hogmanay celebrations, with music from Michelle McManus, John Carmichael and some surprise guests. There were stories from Elaine C. Smith, Cameron Stout, Aggie MacKenzie, Sanjeev Kohli, Limmy and others – and messages to loved ones who find themselves away from home at that momentous time of the year.

Colin and Justin on the Estate – 2008
McAllister and Ryan attempted to visually transform a council estate in Glasgow (Arden, on the south side of the city) in their 2007 show on Five. The premise was that everyone should be entitled to a good standard of living, no matter where they are on the social strata. An anniversary TV 'one year on' revisit is currently being planned.

In September 2008, they organised and ran a charity auction at the Oran Mor arts centre in Glasgow, to raise money for the event. It was attended by national and local celebrities, including Anna Ryder Richardson and Atomic Kitten's Liz McClarnon.

Colin and Justin's Home Heist
Colin and Justin's show Home Heist was filmed in Canada and is similar to How Not to Decorate, for North American audiences. Colin and Justin moved to Toronto in 2008 in preparation for the show, which premiered on the HGTV network in October 2009. The show has already been bought by multiple international broadcasters.  The Canadian program's team also includes Cheryl Torrenueva, a designer and presenter associated with other TV shows such as Restaurant Impossible and Game of Homes on The W Network.

Colin and Justin's Home Show
Colin and Justin visit different shopping centres/malls, create a set of a house in the middle of it, then proceed to decorate the set with items from the stores in the mall. The series was filmed before a live audience, and first shown in the UK on UKTV Style.

Colin and Justin's Music Makeover
The Scots decorators hosted this drive time BBC Radio Scotland series which aired on Friday at 18:00 – 19:00.  In total there were three successful series which concluded towards the end of 2009. Renowned for its pacy, irreverent formula the series was a mix of gossip, social comment and music.

I'm a Celebrity…Get Me out of Here!
Both Colin and Justin were contestants on I'm a Celebrity…Get Me out of Here! (UK series 9).  Colin was voted out by the public on Tuesday, 24 November 2009 and Justin was voted out on Thursday, 3 December 2009 after making it to the final evening of the show, eventually finishing fourth.

The Ant and Dec Christmas Special

Colin and Justin play The Ugly Sisters in this ITV1 programme panto sketch. The show was broadcast on 26 December 2009 and also featured Piers Morgan, Amanda Holden and Robbie Williams.

2010–2012
Colin and Justin's Influence Range at Matalan

The decorators worked with UK department store Matalan and launched several large homewares collections for the 190 store chain.  A further collection of festive decorations augmented their range with the company.

Colin and Justin at Zellers, Canada

The decorators collaborated with Canadian department store Zellers, and their first collection of named brand bedding was available between January 2010 and July 2011.

Home Heist now broadcasts in approximately 35 countries such as Australia, Poland and South Africa, New Zealand, France, Germany and China
Ant and Dec's Saturday Night Take Away*

The decorators have guested twice on this ITV1 show, both times dressed as elves, as part of the live action fun.

Loose Women

Colin and Justin have guested many times on this magazine show format on ITV during 2010.

 The Hour, STV, Scotland 

The decorators appeared frequently on this tea time chat show.

CityLine, Citytv, Canada

The UK decorators have guested many throughout 2010 on CityLine, a Canadian magazine format lifestyle show.

Breakfast Television, Citytv, Canada

Colin and Justin regularly guest star on this early morning TV show, which is similar to GMTV in The UK.60 Minute Makeover, ITV, UKFrom January 2011, when the successful TV makeover series was re-formatted without its previous host Terri Dwyer, Colin and Justin, amongst others, joined as regular new presenters/decorators and fronted 24 episodes.Colin and Justin's After The Heist Home TourIn conjunction with The Canadian Cancer Society, the decorators created a fund-raising event to benefit those living with, or affected by, cancer. Essentially a grand gala evening and a guided tour around 20 of the 52 homes made over during their series, all profits were donated to the CCS.The West Coast Women's Show, The Cottage Life Spring and Fall Shows, The Toronto Fall Home Show, The Calgary Home Show, The One of a Kind Show, The Vancouver Home Show etc.The British decorators regularly headline these visiting home fairs across Canada and appear, in design workshops, to dispense style guidance to the tens of thousands of paying guests who visit each season.Celebrity Coach TripIn February 2010 Colin and Justin appeared in TV Series Celebrity Coach Trip.Colin & Justin's Sunday ShowAfter a Co-hosting with Ewan on Real Radio Breakfast show, for one day, Colin & Justin's were offered their own brand new radio show.  The series went out for a 13-week run on Sundays during the summer of 2011.Celebrity MasterChef 2012Both were participants in the sixth series of Celebrity MasterChef.The Real Hustle 2012 Both appeared as guests.

Colin and Justin Home 2012 to present day
The designers launched a homewares collection with a large range of decorative designer items such as crockery, linens, artwork, lightings and chairs.  The range is available in a cross selection or retailers such as Winners and Homesense in Canada and stores like TJ Maxx and Home Goods in the USA.  Now in its third year, the collection includes around 50 different items from toss pillows to lawn chairs and from towels to bathroom accessories.

2014 to present day

 Colin and Justin's Cabin PressureDebuting in 2014 on Cottage Life and OutTV, Colin and Justin's Cabin Pressure is a series in which the duo purchase and renovate a log cabin in Haliburton County, a popular cottage country region in the Canadian province of Ontario.  Due to the success of the series, a second season was quickly green lit and it launched in March 2015 and currently airs on Cottage Life at 9pm each Sunday. Season 3 of Cabin Pressure aired in Spring 2016Cityline – City TV CanadaThe British designers are now resident guest experts on the daytime talk show CityLine.  Hosted by Tracy Moore, the show airs across Canada and McAllister and Ryan focus on cash conscious ways to create a stylish home.  Shopping trends are covered as up cycling and ways in which to create designer looks on a budget.  Colin and Justin also host out and about 'roving reporter' design related segments for the show.City TV News  
Colin and Justin are annual special red carpet correspondents (and in fact have been since 2011) during the yearly Toronto International Film Festival.  In their time with the network they have interviewed Madonna, George Clooney, Ryan Gosling, Hugh Jackman, Jennifer Lawrence, Bradley Cooper, Emma Thompson, Colin Farrell, Elton John and perhaps 200 other major Hollywood names.The W Network, April 2015Game of Homes: Colin are Justin were guest celebrity judges on the exterior design episode of this large format show.  The programme gave them the opportunity to work once again with Cheryl Torrenueva (resident judge throughout the series) with whom they worked on HGTV's 'Colin and Justin's Home Heist'. Other guest judges included The Property Brothers and Jillian Harris.  When Season 2 Game of Homes was ordered by W Network, Colin and Justin were this time cast as permanent judges and appear on every episode.  Season 2 aired in Spring 2016.

AustraliaThe Block, Channel NineColin and Justin guest starred as judges on an episode on the Eleventh season of the Australian renovation/property series.The Living Room, Channel TenIn Summer 2015 Colin and Justin co-hosted one episode of the prime time lifestyle show, standing in for regular co-host Dr Chris who was off air whilst presenting I'm a Celebrity...Get Me Out of Here!, Australia with Julia Morris. They also guested on a second episode of The Living Room and redecorated two Canadian homes as part of their deal.

 Reno Rumble, Channel NineColin and Justin were the main judges in the second season of Australian TV renovation series, Reno Rumble, in 2016.

CanadaGreat Canadian Cottages, Cottage Life, October 2018Colin and Justin present a brand new series in search of the quintessential "Great Canadian Cottage". Following three seasons of their rustic reno show Cabin Pressure, the duo head out of the city once again to explore lake homes, forest retreats and other escapes sharing stories and experiences with others who have chosen to escape the city and make the Canadian countryside their vacation destination.

Colin and Justin's Great Escapes - BBC Scotland 2020.  Colin and Justin showcase a selection of North America's most beautiful holiday homes in this international documentary series.

In 2020, the duo appeared as celebrity contestants in the "Snatch Game" episode of the first season of Canada's Drag Race.

United KingdomColin and Justin's Hotel Nightmare, September 2022'This is a programme for Channel 5 in the UK, even though it charts the conversion of McAllister and Ryan's ocean side resort/hotel in Cape Breton, Nova Scotia, Canada.  The show was produced by WBD's British TV production company Ricochet, a firm with whom the duo made the majority of their previous shows. The multi episode reality TV documentary was ordered initially for UK broadcast, though an international option will allow broadcasters from around the world to option the series.

BooksEscapology - Modern Cabins, Cottages and Retreats - published by Figure 1 in Canada is a Globe and Mail best seller and has remained in the Amazon top ten (in various categories) since it published in November 2020.  Profiled by The New York Post and Forbes, it remains in print across the world.The Million Pound Property Experiment – published by BBC World Wide in 2004, which went on to win the People's Choice Lifestyle Book of the Year with WH Smith.How Not To Decorate – accompanied the successful TV show of the same name. Published by Time Warner, 2006.Colin and Justin's Home Heist Style Guide – How To Create The Perfect Home – this book accompanies the series 'Colin and Justins Home Heist', released 1 October 2008. Published by Penguin, Canadian Publications.

Magazine Columns – drawing on their journalistic background, the decorators for ten years wrote a weekly column in The Sunday Mail (Scotland)

Column
The pair also writes a weekly column in the Friday and Sunday editions of the Toronto Sun'', offering up their suggestions for sprucing up homes.  The column syndicates to 24 Hours Vancouver, 24 Hours Toronto and The London Free Press.  The column is also available online.
Colin and Justin contribute a weekly column to The Huffington Post and to Cottage Life Magazine as a companion to their current Cottage Life TV show.

Product – the duo have brought their global product interior design range to Canada and it can be found in stores such as Homesense, Winners and Marshalls.  It can be found in the US in T J Maxx and in the UK in T K Maxx.

References

External links

Colin & Justin biography via HGTV Canada
 Articles by Colin and Justin for the Toronto Star 

Living people
Year of birth missing (living people)
Business duos
Mass media people from Glasgow
Scottish interior designers
Scottish television presenters
British LGBT broadcasters
Scottish LGBT entertainers
Married couples
Scottish expatriates in Canada
I'm a Celebrity...Get Me Out of Here! (British TV series) participants
Same-sex couples
21st-century LGBT people